The 1877 United States Senate special election in Pennsylvania was held on March 20, 1877. J. Donald Cameron was elected by the Pennsylvania General Assembly to the United States Senate.

Background
Republican Simon Cameron was elected to the United States Senate by the Pennsylvania General Assembly, consisting of the House of Representatives and the Senate, in 1867 and was re-elected in 1873. Sen. Cameron resigned on March 12, 1877.

Results
Following the resignation of Sen. Simon Cameron, the Pennsylvania General Assembly convened on March 20, 1877, to elect a new Senator to fill the vacancy. Former United States Secretary of War J. Donald Cameron, Simon Cameron's son, was elected to complete his father's term, set to expire on March 4, 1879. The results of the vote of both houses combined are as follows:

|-
|-bgcolor="#EEEEEE"
| colspan="3" align="right" | Totals
| align="right" | 251
| align="right" | 100.00%
|}

See also  
 United States Senate elections, 1876 and 1877

References

External links
Pennsylvania Election Statistics: 1682-2006 from the Wilkes University Election Statistics Project

1877 special
Pennsylvania 1877
Pennsylvania special
United States Senate 1877 special
United States Senate 1877 special
Pennsylvania 1877